Jim Griffin (born 1 January 1967) is a Scottish former football midfielder who played for Motherwell in the late 1980s and early 1990s. Griffin played in Motherwell's 1991 Scottish Cup Final-winning side.

Honours
Motherwell 
 Scottish Cup (1): 1991

References

External links 

1967 births
Living people
Association football midfielders
Motherwell F.C. players
Scottish Football League players
Scottish footballers
Footballers from Hamilton, South Lanarkshire